Ildo Augusto dos Santos Lopes Fortes (born 13 December 1964) is a Cape Verdean clergyman and the second and current bishop of Mindelo.

Biography
He was born in the island of Sal in Cape Verde, at the time under Portuguese rule.

dos Santos Lopes Fortes received his priestly ordination on 29 November 1992. On 25 January 2011, he was nominated as bishop of Mindelo. The diocese covering the Barlavento Islands was vacant from August 2009 as the last bishop Arlindo Gomes Furtado became bishop of Santiago de Cabo Verde later that time. On 10 April, he became the second and present bishop of Mindelo.

The Patriarch of Lisbon, José da Cruz Cardinal Policarpo conferred upon him episcopal consecration on April 3 that year. The principal co-consecrators included Arlindo Gomes Furtado, bishop of Santiago de Cabo Verde and Manuel José Macário do Nascimento Clemente, Bishop of Porto.

References

External links
 Ildo Augusto dos Santos Lopes Fortes at catholic-hierarchy.org

1964 births
Living people
21st-century Roman Catholic bishops in Cape Verde
People from Sal, Cape Verde
Roman Catholic bishops of Mindelo